Henriette Hansen (born 20 July 1998) is a Danish handball player who currently plays for Skanderborg Håndbold in the Damehåndboldligaen.

On 20 April 2021, it was announced that she had signed a 1-year contract with Skanderborg Håndbold, on a transfer from Vendsyssel Håndbold.

Achievements
Danish Championship:
Runners-up: 2019
Bronze: 2017

References

1998 births
Living people
Danish female handball players
People from Esbjerg Municipality
Sportspeople from the Region of Southern Denmark
21st-century Danish women